Alexandru Lungu (April 23, 1924 – 2008) was a Romanian poet.

Born in Cetatea Albă, he made his literary debut in 1939 and moved to West Germany in 1973. He died in Bonn.

Notes

1924 births
2008 deaths
People from Bilhorod-Dnistrovskyi
Romanian male poets
Romanian emigrants to Germany
20th-century Romanian poets
20th-century Romanian male writers